Balram Yadav is a leader of the Samajwadi Party in Uttar Pradesh.

On 10 June 2016, he was re-elected to the Uttar Pradesh Legislative Council. He has four children including Sangram Yadav, also a politician of Samajwadi party. He is one of the founders of the party. He was elected as a minister of Uttar Pradesh 2012.

References

Living people
Date of birth missing (living people)
Members of the Uttar Pradesh Legislative Council
Samajwadi Party politicians
Samajwadi Party politicians from Uttar Pradesh
1942 births